This is a list of foreign ministers of Transnistria.

Sources
Rulers.org – Foreign ministers L–R

Foreign affairs ministries
Foreign relations of Transnistria